Komsilga is the name of several settlements in Burkina Faso. It may refer to:

 Komsilga, Bam, a village in Bam Department
 Komsilga, Baskouré, a village in Baskouré Department
 Komsilga, Komsilga, a town in the Komsilga Department